The Atlas of the DC Universe by Paul Kupperberg was published in 1990 by Mayfair Games as a supplement to its DC Heroes role-playing game. It includes maps and information about locations in the DC Universe; for example, it places Metropolis in Delaware and Gotham City in New Jersey.

Content
The Atlas of the DC Universe was designed to serve both as a gaming material for the DC Heroes role-playing game, published by Mayfair, and a standalone "in-universe" reference book for the fans of DC Comics. Many of the cities, such as Metropolis and Star City, were given exact locations on maps provided within the book.

Maps of the galaxy, and other important planets within the DC universe are also included.

References

Kupperberg, Paul (1990) Atlas of the DC Universe. DC Comics/Mayfair Games

External links
 Atlas of the DC Universe (website based on the book)

1990 books
 
DC Universe
DC Comics titles